"Ostrich policy" is a metaphoric expression referring to the tendency to ignore obvious matters and pretend they do not exist; the expression derives from the supposed habit of ostriches to stick their head in the sand rather than face danger. 

Ostriches do not actually bury their heads in the sand to avoid danger.

References

Figures of speech